Lantenne-Vertière is a commune in the Doubs department in the Bourgogne-Franche-Comté region in eastern France.

History
The 17th-century castle was built in 1687 for the Lord of Vertière and then belonged to the Saint Claude family.

Population

See also
 Communes of the Doubs department

References

External links

 Lantenne-Vertière on the intercommunal Web site of the department 

Communes of Doubs